East of the River Nile is a 1977 reggae studio album (see 1977 in music) by Jamaican musician Augustus Pablo.  A purely instrumental album, East of the River Nile showcases Pablo's skill on the melodica, and various other keyboards.  Also featured are studio musicians famous as members of The Wailers, Bob Marley's backing band.

A reissue of East of the River Nile, with six bonus tracks, charted on Billboard's Reggae Albums chart in 2002 (see 2002 in music), peaking at #13.

Track listing 
All track composed by Horace Swaby
All tracks mixed by King Tubby, except "Upful Living" mixed by Lee Perry

Side one
 "Chant to King Selassie I"  (with Ja-Malla Band)
 "Natural Way" (with Ja-Malla Band)
 "Nature Dub"
 "Upfull Living" (with The Upsetters)
 "Unfinished Melody" (with The Upsetters)
 "Jah Light"

Side two
 "Memories of the Ghetto" (with The Upsetters)
 "Africa (1983)"
 "East of the River Nile"
 "Sounds from Levi"
 "Chapter 2"
 "Addis Ababa"

2002 CD reissue extra tracks
 "East Africa" 
 "East of the River Nile" (Original) 
 "Memories of the Ghetto Dub" 
 "Jah Light Version" 
 "Islington Rock" 
 "Meditation Dub"

Personnel 
 Augustus Pablo – organ, piano, strings, keyboards, clavinet, melodica
 Aston "Family Man" Barrett – bass
 Clayton Downie – bass
 Robert "Robbie" Shakespeare – bass
 Earl "Bagga" Walker – bass
 Carlton "Carlie" Barrett – drums
 Noel "Alphonso" Benbow – drums
 Max Edwards – drums
 Earl "Chinna" Smith – lead guitar
 Everton Da Silva – percussions
 Ja-Malla Band – played on "Chant to King Selassie I" and "Natural Way"
 The Upsetters played on "Upfull Living", "Unfinished Melody" and "Memories of the Ghetto"
Technical
Ernest Hookim, Errol Thompson, Lee Perry, Prince Jammy, Sylvan Morris – engineer
 King Tubby – mixing
 Lee Perry – mixing
Orville "Bagga" Case – artwork
Walsh's Photo Studio - cover photography

References

External links 

Roots Archives

Augustus Pablo albums
Message Records albums
1977 albums
Shanachie Records albums
Dub albums